"Songs My Mother Taught Me" is the title of a song for voice and piano, written by Charles Ives (S. 361, K. 6B21c) in 1895 and set to a poem by Adolf Heyduk.
Ives' song was written some fifteen years after Dvořák's setting of the same poem. New York City Ballet balletmaster Jerome Robbins used it for one of the dances he made in Ives, Songs.

Songs about music
Songs about mothers
1895 songs
Compositions by Charles Ives